As a surname, Chong may refer to:

 Hakka romanizations of the Chinese surnames Zhang (trad. , simp. ), Zhang and Zhuang (t , s )
 Cantonese and Gan romanizations of the Chinese surnames Zhang (trad. , simp. ) and Zhang
 a variant Minnan romanization of the Chinese surname Zheng (t , s )
 a Cantonese romanization of the Chinese surnames Zhong (t , s ) and Zhong
 Cantonese and Gan romanizations of the Chinese surname Zhuang (t , s )
 the McCune romanization of the Korean surname Jeong

Chong is the 19th-most-common surname among Chinese Singaporeans, with 23,100 bearers in the year 2000. There were 10,740 Chongs found by the 2000 United States Census, ranking Chong 2,561st most common overall and 96th most common among Asians and Pacific Islanders. Chong was also listed among the 200-most-common peculiarly Chinese surnames in a 2010 survey of the Registered Persons Database of Canadian health card recipients in the province of Ontario.

List of persons with the surname

張 and 张
 Chong Chieng Jen, Malaysian politician
 Gordon Chong, Toronto politician
 Hon. Ida Chong, Canadian politician
 Ping Chong, American director, choreographer, and artist
 Chong Fah Cheong, Singaporean artist

章
 Chong Eng, Malaysian politician
 Chong Kah Kiat, Malaysian politician

鄭 and 郑
 Denise Chong, Canadian economist

鍾 and 钟
 Annabel Chong, stage name of Grace Quek, Singaporean-born American pornographic actress

莊 and 庄
 Kevin Chong, Hong Kong-born Canadian author
 Marcus Chong né Marcus Wyatt, adopted son of Tommy Chong, American actor
 Hon. Michael Chong, Canadian politician
 Michelle Chong (born 1977), Singaporean actress and director
 Peter Chong (criminal), former leader of the Wo Hop To syndicate
 Rae Dawn Chong, daughter of Tommy Chong, Canadian actress
 Robbi Chong, daughter of Tommy Chong, Canadian actress and model
 Tommy Chong (born 1938), Canadian-born American comedian and actor
 Elkie Chong (born 1998), Hong Kong singer, dancer, member of the South Korean group CLC

Unknown
 Cecile Chong, American artist
 Christina Chong, British actress
 Guillermo Chong, Chilean geologist
 Jason Chong, Australian actor
 Kristian Chong, 21st-century Australian concert pianist
 Miguel Ángel Osorio Chong, Mexican politician
 Susien Chong, fashion designer
 Tahith Chong, professional association football player

References

Multiple Chinese surnames
Chinese-language surnames
Korean-language surnames
Surnames of Korean origin